The District of North Saanich is located on the Saanich Peninsula of British Columbia, approximately  north of Victoria on southern Vancouver Island. It is one of the 13 Greater Victoria municipalities.

History

In July 1905, North Saanich, then including the townsite of Sidney, was incorporated with the original Municipal Hall located in Sidney. Lacking population and a firm tax base, the municipality was dissolved in 1911. In 1940, the site of the present Victoria International Airport was selected as a military forces base and the area boomed with the influx of 10,000 military personnel, leading to incorporation for the Village of Sidney in 1952.  Four years later, the residents of the North Saanich unorganized area, numbering 2,865, requested that letters patent be issued to form the "North Saanich Fire Prevention District" with power to own property, to tax and to borrow. In 1965, after a favourable public vote, the letters patent were withdrawn and the North Saanich Municipal District was established with offices at the present location on Mills Road.

Demographics

Ethnicity

Religion 
According to the 2021 census, religious groups in North Saanich included:
Irreligion (6,910 persons or 56.7%)
Christianity (4,905 persons or 40.2%)
Sikhism (150 persons or 1.2%)
Buddhism (100 persons or 0.8%)
Judaism (20 persons or 0.2%)
Other (110 persons or 0.9%)

Fauna

The largest animal to be found in North Saanich is the cougar. Other native mammals include the black-tailed deer, mink, otter, raccoon, and deer mouse. Of introduced mammal species, the cottontail rabbit and gray squirrel are often seen. Common native birds include the northwestern crow, common raven, bald eagle, turkey vulture, American robin, varied thrush, Steller's jay, and several species of gull. Introduced birds are represented by the abundant common starling and the now declining Eurasian skylark.

Flora

The most common native tree in North Saanich is Douglas fir. The other common large conifers are Abies grandis (grand fir) and Thuja plicata (western red cedar). Tsuga heterophylla (western hemlock) is occasionally found. Taxus brevifolia (Pacific yew) is a frequent understory tree. The Arbutus menziesii (Pacific madrone) is a large broadleaf evergreen species. Large deciduous trees are Populus balsamifera (black cottonwood), Acer macrophyllum (bigleaf maple), Alnus rubra (red alder), and Quercus garryana (Garry oak). Small deciduous species include Prunus emarginata (bitter cherry), Rhamnus purshiana (cascara), Malus fusca (Pacific crabapple), Cornus nuttallii (Pacific dogwood), Populus tremuloides (quaking aspen), Acer glabrum (Douglas maple), Crataegus monogyna (common hawthorn) and Salix lucida (Pacific willow).

Climate
North Saanich has a warm-summer Mediterranean climate (Köppen Csb) with short, warm, and dry summers and long, cool, and wet winters.

Council and government

The 2022 – 2024 council is:
 Mayor Peter Jones
 Councillor Jack McClintock
 Councillor Sanjiv Shrivastava
 Councillor Celia Stock
 Councillor Irene McConkey
 Councillor Phil DiBattista
 Councillor Brett Smyth

The next election is scheduled for October 19, 2024, following provincial law. All municipalities in British Columbia will also hold elections on this date (the third Saturday of October every 4 years). Voters will vote for councillors, school board trustees and the mayor on the same ballot.

Education
Public schools serving North Saanich residents are operated by School District 63 Saanich. These include ḰELSET and Deep Cove Elementary Schools, North Saanich Middle School, and Parkland Secondary School.

Transportation

North Saanich can be accessed by highway on Highway 17 from Victoria, Sidney or Vancouver (through the BC Ferries terminal at Swartz Bay). Victoria International Airport is also located in the municipality, which offers daily service to Calgary, Edmonton, SeaTac, San Francisco, Kelowna, Toronto and hourly service to Vancouver International from Air Canada Express. The airport also offers seasonal services to Mexico and Hawaii, with talk about expansion to Europe or Asia. North Saanich also has a floatplane aerodrome near the Institute of Ocean Sciences in Patricia Bay, the Victoria Airport Water Aerodrome. Formerly the hub for Pat Bay Air, the aerodrome is now served by Harbour Air Seaplanes, Kenmore Air, Ocean Air Floatplanes and Salt Spring Air, which offer scheduled and charter flights.

Public transport is provided by the Victoria Regional Transit System.

North Saanich has seven marinas, many of which can accommodate temporary visitors. The highest concentration of marinas (five of the seven) is on the southern coast, between Curteis Point (near the ferry terminal) and McDonald Park Road, near Parkland Secondary School.

Neighbourhoods
 Ardmore: population approximately 1,050; the entire neighbourhood is mostly evenly dense. Ardmore contains a cemetery and the nine hole Ardmore Golf Course. It borders the Institute of Ocean Sciences to the north and Pauquachin First Nation to the south.
 Cloake and Horth Hills: population approximately 1,200; the densest area is uphill on Cloake Hill. Horth Hill Regional Park, managed by the Capital Regional District (CRD) is located near the centre. The park offers a viewpoint, the second highest in North Saanich after Mount Newton. There are no commercial establishments in all of this neighbourhood, it is purely residential and forested, like much of the municipality. The north shore, at the very end of the Saanich Peninsula, offers several beach accesses with views of the Satellite Channel, Mount Tuam on Salt Spring Island and other surrounding islands.
 Dean Park: population approximately 3,200; it is the most populous and dense neighbourhood in the municipality. It is mostly located on the sloped eastern flank of Mount Newton, directly below John Dean Provincial Park. Below the hill with a high concentration of streets is where Kelset Elementary, the Panorama Recreation Centre and the McTavish Junction (containing commercial space) are located. Dean Park borders Central Saanich.
 Deep Cove: population approximately 2,000 with the Coal Point and marina area being the most densely populated area. Along West Saanich Road between Clayton and Wain roads is where "downtown" is located. This area contains a firehall, gas station, the Deep Cove Market, a church and Deep Cove Elementary School.
 Central North Saanich: the population of this area is not well defined. The area is often regarded as having several neighbourhoods within and is little known as a whole, associated neighbourhoods include Pat Bay, Sandown, Victoria International Airport and the Eagle Ridge Estates. Central North Saanich contains the airport, the Dunsmuir Lodge, the Institute of Ocean Sciences and the former Sandown Harness Racetrack. This neighbourhood is the largest in terms of area, and the least in terms of density and perhaps population. The two First Nations reserves, industrial area, Municipal Hall of North Saanich, rock quarry, free ride park, gun club and most agricultural land can also be found here.
 McDonald Park/Curteis Point: population approximately 900; it is the least populous and smallest neighbourhood. Although small, it is the most industrious for its size. Dubbed "North Saanich's Marine Neighbourhood", McDonald Park/Curteis Point consists of five marinas around a small cove and inlet, which includes repair and boat yards. BC Ferries' Swartz Bay Ferry Terminal is on the north edge. McDonald Campground part of the Gulf Islands National Park Reserve occupies much of the southeast along with Blue Heron Park, which includes a soccer field. Parkland Secondary School, North Saanich Middle School and a small suburban-like sliver of the district surrounded by Sidney can be found at the southernmost extent.
Southeast Quadrant ("Bazan Bay"): Population approximately 1,200; it is a small neighbourhood, the second most developed after Dean Park. Sidney borders discreetly to the north and Central Saanich to the south. highway 17 splits down this neighbourhood. The northern third is more rural, and the southern two thirds are sloped with many houses. The houses and beaches have a superb view of the Gulf and San Juan islands as well as downtown Sidney and, at night, possibly a glimpse of Metro Vancouver Regional District. The Government of Canada operates a plant health research centre here for the Food Inspection Agency.
North Saanich also surrounds two First Nations reserves, namely the Tseycum First Nation, located on the northeastern shore of Patricia Bay, and the Pauquachin First Nation, located on the southeastern shore of Coles Bay south of Ardmore. These First Nations are not, strictly speaking, part of North Saanich.

Attractions

 North Saanich Farm Market 
 British Columbia Aviation Museum
 Institute of Ocean Sciences
 North Saanich Freeride Park 
 443 Maritime Helicopter Squadron (Canadian Forces)
 Victoria International Airport
 BC Ferries Swartz Bay Ferry Terminal
 Panorama Recreation Centre

Notable people

 Muriel Wylie Blanchet, travel writer (1891–1961) best known for The Curve of Time, lived on Curteis Point in North Saanich.
 Sebastian Cabot, star of the television program Family Affair, had a summer home in the Deep Cove neighbourhood of North Saanich.

Notes

References

External links

District municipalities in British Columbia
Populated places in the Capital Regional District
Greater Victoria
Saanich Peninsula